For the Beauty of Wynona is the second album by Canadian songwriter and record producer Daniel Lanois. It was released on March 23, 1993.

The album cover photograph, titled "The Knife", was taken in 1987 by Czech artist Jan Saudek. The image was censored upon release in the United States.

Critical reception

The Los Angeles Times called the album "a work of considerable imagination and force." Trouser Press wrote that it trades "increased accessibility for diminished depth."

Track listing
All songs written by Daniel Lanois; unless otherwise noted.

 "The Messenger" – 5:27
 "Brother L.A." – 4:19
 "Still Learning How to Crawl" (Lanois, Daryl Johnson) – 5:19
 "Beatrice" – 4:21
 "Waiting" – 2:00
 "The Collection of Marie Claire" – 4:17
 "Death of a Train" – 5:47
 "The Unbreakable Chain" – 4:19
 "Lotta Love to Give" – 3:38
 "Indian Red" (George Landry) – 3:46
 "Sleeping in the Devil's Bed" – 3:02
 "For the Beauty of Wynona" – 5:50
 "Rocky World" – 2:55

"The Messenger" and "Lotta Love to Give" were released as singles. "Sleeping in the Devil's Bed" had been previously released on the soundtrack Until the End of the World (released December 10, 1991).

Personnel 
Daniel Lanois – guitar, bass, vocals
Malcolm Burn – guitar, keyboards
Bill Dillon – guitar, mandolin, Guitorgan M300
Daryl Johnson– bass, percussion, drums, vocals
Ronald Jones – drums
Nicholas Payton – trumpet
Emanual de Casal - bass on "Brother L. A."
Sean Devitt - percussion on "For the Beauty of Wynona"

References

External links 
Lyrics

Daniel Lanois albums
1993 albums
Albums produced by Daniel Lanois
Warner Records albums
Experimental rock albums by Canadian artists